William Boys may refer to:

 William Boys (MP) (1541–1596), English politician, member of parliament for Queenborough
 William Boys (surgeon) (1735–1803), English surgeon and topographer
 William Alves Boys (1868–1938), Canadian politician and barrister
 William Boys (Royal Navy officer) (1700–1774)
 William Boys, one of the Members of the Tasmanian House of Assembly, 1856–1861